Tingotomo is a rural locality (a village) in Beketovskoye Rural Settlement, Vozhegodsky District, Vologda Oblast, Russia. The population was 16 as of 2002.

Geography 
Tingotomo is located 72 km southwest of Vozhega (the district's administrative centre) by road. Kalikinsky Bereznik is the nearest rural locality.

References 

Rural localities in Vozhegodsky District